Léveillé may refer to:
 André Léveillé (born 1933), a politician in Quebec, Canada
 André Léveillé (painter) (1880–1962), a French painter
 Augustin Abel Hector Léveillé (1863–1918), a botanist
 Joseph-Henri Léveillé (1796–1870), a French physician and mycologist
 Mathieu Léveillé (1709–1743), an executioner in Canada
 Michel Fourquin dit Léveillé  (1791–1861), a farmer and political figure in Canada East
 Philippe Léveillé (born 1963), a French-Italian chef, restaurateur and television personality

See also
 Leveille